Perry J. Hudson (June 14, 1916 – May 14, 1998) was an American politician. He served as a Democratic member for the 35th district of the Georgia State Senate.

Life and career 
Hudson was born in Douglas County, Georgia. At the age of six, he and his family moved to Hapeville, Georgia. He attended the University of Georgia.

Hudson was mayor of Hapeville, Georgia. In 1967, he was elected to represent the 35th district of the Georgia State Senate. He served until 1983, when he was succeeded by Frank E. Coggin.

Hudson died in May 1998 of heart failure at the South Fulton Hospital, at the age of 81.

References 

1916 births
1998 deaths
People from Douglas County, Georgia
Democratic Party Georgia (U.S. state) state senators
20th-century American politicians
University of Georgia alumni
Mayors of places in Georgia (U.S. state)